Erika Seltenreich-Hodgson (born April 24, 1995) is a Canadian competitive swimmer. She won a bronze medal at the 2015 Pan American Games in Toronto and also won a bronze medal at the 2011 World Junior Championships in Lima.

Career

2016 season
In 2016, she was named to Canada's Olympic team for the 2016 Summer Olympics in the 200 individual medley event in which she made it to the semi-finals in Rio.

2018 season
In September 2017, Seltenreich-Hodgson was named to Canada's 2018 Commonwealth Games team.

References

External links
 
 
 
 
 
 
 

1995 births
Living people
Swimmers at the 2015 Pan American Games
Swimmers at the 2014 Commonwealth Games
Pan American Games bronze medalists for Canada
Canadian female medley swimmers
Swimmers from Ottawa
Swimmers at the 2016 Summer Olympics
Olympic swimmers of Canada
Pan American Games medalists in swimming
Swimmers at the 2018 Commonwealth Games
Commonwealth Games medallists in swimming
Commonwealth Games bronze medallists for Canada
Medalists at the 2015 Pan American Games
21st-century Canadian women
Medallists at the 2018 Commonwealth Games